The El Paso Golf Classic was an annual golf tournament for professional women golfers on the Futures Tour, the LPGA's developmental tour. The event was a part of the Futures Tour's schedule from 2002 through 2008. It took place at the Underwood Golf Complex in El Paso, Texas.  

The tournament was a 54-hole event, as are most Futures Tour tournaments, and included a pre-tournament pro-am event, in which local amateur golfers can play with the professional golfers from the Tour as a benefit for local charities. The benefiting charity for the El Paso Golf Classic was the Rotary Club of West El Paso Foundation.

From 2003 through 2006 the tournament was known as the IOS Golf Classic, with the name sponsorship held by International Outsourcing Services, or IOS, an El Pasobased data services company and the  largest coupon clearinghouse for grocery store retailers' and manufacturers' coupons in the United States. On March 8, 2007, 11 persons associated with IOS, including its president and chief operating officer, were indicted on wire-fraud charges and with carrying out a scheme to defraud manufacturers that use coupons to market their products to consumers. Shortly thereafter, the Futures Tour and the El Paso tournament withdrew the name of IOS as a sponsor for the tournament and the event was renamed the El Paso Golf Classic.

Tournament names through the years:
2002: El Paso Futures Golf Classic
2003–06: IOS Golf Classic
2007–08: El Paso Golf Classic

Winners

Tournament records

References

External links
Futures Tour official website

Former Symetra Tour events
Golf in Texas
Sports in El Paso, Texas